Dendrosenecio battiscombei (synonym Senecio battiscombei) is one of the giant groundsels that lives on the slopes of Mount Kenya and the Aberdare Range. Like Dendrosenecio adnivalis on the Ruwenzori Mountains and the Virunga Mountains, Dendrosenecio battiscombei grows in the lower wetter areas of the Afro-Alpine zone.

Infraspecific name synonymy
Dendrosenecio battiscombei (R.E.Fr. & T.C.E.Fr.) E.B.Knox
Dendrosenecio johnstonii (Oliv.) B.Nord. subsp. battiscombei (R.E.Fr. & T.C.E.Fr.) B.Nord.  
Senecio aberdaricus R.E.Fr. & T.C.E.Fr.  
Senecio battiscombei R.E.Fr. & T.C.E.Fr.  
Senecio johnstonii Oliv. var. battiscombei (R.E.Fr. & T.C.E.Fr.) Mabb.

References

External links

kilimanjari
Endemic flora of Kenya
Mount Kenya
Afromontane flora